Jack Robertson (23 June 1902 – 23 December 1972) was a former Australian rules footballer who played with Melbourne in the Victorian Football League (VFL).

Family
The son of John Robertson, and Margaret Robertson, née Campbell, John Robertson was born at Melbourne on 23 June 1902.

Military service
Robertson later served in the Australian Army during World War II.

Death
He died at Middle Park, Victoria on 23 December 1972.

Notes

References
 
 World War Two Nominal Roll: Private John Robertson (NX40474), Department of Veterans' Affairs.
 B883, NX40474: World War Two Service Record: Private John Robertson (NX40474), National Archives of Australia.

External links 
 
 
 Jack Robertson, at Demonwiki.

1902 births
Australian rules footballers from Victoria (Australia)
Melbourne Football Club players
1972 deaths